Islamicist may refer to:

Chief usage: Specialist in Islamic studies
Occasional usage: Islamic fundamentalist, Islamist

See also
Islam (disambiguation)
Islamicism (disambiguation)
Muslimist (disambiguation)